"End of a Century" is a song by English alternative rock band Blur. Released in November 1994, it was the last single to be released from their third album, Parklife (1994). "End of a Century" reached number 19 on the UK Singles Chart, considered a disappointment by Andy Ross of Food Records. Albarn later stated that "End of a Century" may not have been the best choice for the album's fourth single, and that "This Is a Low" would have been a better alternative.

Lyrical content 
Damon Albarn stated that the song is about "how couples get into staying in and staring at each other. Only instead of candle-light, it's the TV light." The opening line, "she said there's ants in the carpet", refers to an infestation of ants that Albarn and his then-girlfriend Justine Frischmann suffered in their then-home in Kensington. The lyrics seem to emphasise the then upcoming millennium change and the fact that people contemplate the future rather than take care of the present. Producer Stephen Street saw the song as "Damon getting the art of songwriting really sorted".

Music video 
The video is a live performance recorded at Alexandra Palace. As with their later video to Tender, it uses the audio track of the live performance, rather than overdubbing the audio of the studio take.

Track listings 
7-inch and cassette single
 "End of a Century" (Albarn, Coxon, James and Rowntree; Lyrics by Albarn) – 2:47
 "Red Necks" (Albarn, Coxon, James, Rowntree; Lyrics by Coxon) – 3:04

CD single
 "End of a Century" (Albarn, Coxon, James, Rowntree; Lyrics by Albarn) – 2:47
 "Red Necks" (Albarn, Coxon, James, Rowntree; Lyrics by Coxon) – 3:04
 "Alex's Song" (James) – 2:42

Personnel 
 Damon Albarn – lead vocals, organ
 Graham Coxon – acoustic and electric guitars, clarinet, backing vocals
 Alex James – bass guitar
 Dave Rowntree – drums

Charts

Weekly charts

Year-end charts

References 

1994 singles
1994 songs
Blur (band) songs
Food Records singles
Wikipedia requested audio of songs
Song recordings produced by Stephen Street
Songs written by Alex James (musician)
Songs written by Damon Albarn
Songs written by Dave Rowntree
Songs written by Graham Coxon